Tigani (Τηγάνι) is a small peninsula in the landscape of Mani in southern Greece. The name is Greek for "frying pan". Tigani is surrounded by the sea except for a narrow strip of land that connects to the mainland. The ruins of a probable medieval castle can be found there. Its position and its walls made it extremely hard to capture.

Megali Maina

Many historians believe that Tigani is the location of the castle Megali Maina (also called Grande Magne) because Tigani fits elements of historic descriptions of Megali Maina.

External links
 Where is the castle of the Grand Magne?
 Exploring mysterious Tigani (in German)

Peninsulas of Greece
Mani Peninsula
Landforms of Peloponnese (region)
Landforms of Laconia